Patrick Banda (28 January 1974 – 27 April 1993) was a Zambian footballer and member of the national team.  He was among those killed in the crash of the team plane in Gabon in 1993.

References

External links

1974 births
1993 deaths
Zambian footballers
Zambia international footballers
1992 African Cup of Nations players
Association football forwards
Footballers killed in the 1993 Zambia national football team plane crash